, is a yonkoma manga series by Hisaichi Ishii which ran in the weekly Manga Action magazine from 1978 to 1979 in Japan. After that series ended, Ishii continued creating more baseball gag comics which were then collected under the title  and released from 1985 to 1989.

The main character of the gag comic series is based on (and named for) Kōichi Tabuchi, a Japanese professional baseball player. While in most instances, the character in the manga is referred to using katakana characters, the kanji used for the real Tabuchi were used in one instance.

A series of three anime films based on the manga were released in 1979 and 1980.

Collections

Ganbare!! Tabuchi-kun!!
Volume 1, ISBN none, January 1, 1979, Futabasha
Volume 2, ISBN none, June 20, 1979, Futabasha
Volume 3, ISBN none, December 28, 1979, Futabasha

Ganbare!! Tabuchi-kun!!
 (vol.1)
ISBN none, June 30, 1985, Futabasha
 (vol.2)
ISBN none, December 8, 1985, Futabasha
 (vol.3)
ISBN none, November 28, 1986, Futabasha
 (vol.4)
, April 29, 1988, Futabasha
 (vol.5)
, May 14, 1989, Futabasha

Sources:

References

External links
 at Tokyo Movie Shinsha
 at Tokyo Movie Shinsha
 at Tokyo Movie Shinsha

1978 manga
1979 anime films
1980 anime films
1985 manga
Animated films based on manga
Baseball in anime and manga
Bungeishunjū manga
Comedy anime and manga
Films directed by Tsutomu Shibayama
Futabasha manga
Hisaichi Ishii
Japanese animated films
Manga adapted into films
Seinen manga
Slice of life anime and manga
TMS Entertainment
Yonkoma